A bedpan or bed pan is a receptacle used for the toileting of a bedridden patient in a health care facility, and is usually made of metal, glass, ceramic, or plastic. A bedpan can be used for both urinary and fecal discharge. Many diseases can confine a patient to bed, necessitating the use of bedpans, including Alzheimer's disease, Parkinson's disease, stroke, and dementia. Additionally, many patients may be confined to a bed temporarily as a result of a temporary illness, injury, or surgery.

Bedpans are usually constructed of stainless steel, which is easy to clean and durable, but may be cold, hard, and uncomfortable to use.  Also, the supporting area of some products is very small, and prolonged use can cause pressure ulcers. To solve these problems, ergonomic bedpans have been developed, which support the patient with a larger area of less-conductive plastic. Some designs completely cover the genitalia during use, offering protection and an extra measure of privacy. On the other hand, the material is more difficult to sterilize, and may become a reservoir for microorganisms.

Fracture bedpans are smaller than standard size bedpans, and have one flat end. These bedpans are designed specifically for patients who have had a hip fracture or are recovering from hip replacement. This type of bedpan may be used for those patients who cannot raise their hips high enough or roll over onto a regular size bedpan.

In recent years, single-use bedpan liners made of recycled wood pulp (molded pulp) have become more widely used in UK hospitals; they decrease the risk of cross-contamination.  Another alternative is the plastic bedpan liner. Some liners are made of biodegradable plastic and contain absorbent powder to eliminate splashing and spills.  Liners are used in hospitals to decrease infection, and are also used for home health care.

See also
 Chamber pot
 Urinal (health care), used for male patients' urination

References

Toilets
Medical equipment